The Australian Financial Security Authority (AFSA) is an Australian executive agency part of the portfolio of the Attorney-General that primarily exists to handle bankruptcy applications. The agency was formed in 1999 with the passing of the Public Service Act 1999, succeeding "Insolvency & Trustee Service Australia".

References 

1999 establishments in Australia
Government agencies established in 1999
Commonwealth Government agencies of Australia
Finance in Australia
Bankruptcy